The U.S. Amateur Four-Ball is an amateur golf tournament conducted by the United States Golf Association (USGA). It was first played in 2015 and replaced the U.S. Amateur Public Links, an individual tournament that was played from 1922 to 2014.

The U.S. Amateur Four-Ball is played by "sides" of two golfers, each with handicap indexes of 5.4 or less. 128 sides compete in a 36-hole stroke play qualifier that determines the field of 32 sides for match play. Play is conducted using a four-ball format, where the lowest score by either player on each hole is the score for the side.

The women's counterpart is the U.S. Women's Amateur Four-Ball, also started in 2015.

Winners

Future sites
2023 Kiawah Island Club, Kiawah Island, South Carolina
2024 Philadelphia Cricket Club, Whitemarsh Township, Montgomery County, Pennsylvania
2026 Desert Mountain Club, Scottsdale, Arizona
2037 Bandon Dunes Golf Resort, Bandon, Oregon

References

External links

Team golf tournaments
Amateur Four-Ball
Amateur golf tournaments in the United States